Treforda is a hamlet in the civil parish of Camelford, Cornwall, England, United Kingdom.

Treforda is also a farm in the parish of Forrabury and Minster, Cornwall.

References

Hamlets in Cornwall
Camelford